Theater Chemnitz is the municipal theatre organization in Chemnitz, Germany. Performances of opera, ballet, plays, symphonic concerts, and puppet theatre take place in its three main venues: the Opernhaus Chemnitz (for opera, ballet and musical theatre), the Stadthalle Chemnitz (for concerts), and the Schauspielhaus Chemnitz (for plays and puppet theatre). The award-winning opera company has produced a series of rarely performed works, and several German premieres. Its orchestra is named the Robert-Schumann-Philharmonie.

Opernhaus Chemnitz 
Located at Theaterplatz 2  the Theater Chemnitz was designed by the German architect  and built between 1906 and 1909. Following its destruction during World War II, it was reconstructed between 1947 and 1951. It was renovated again from 1988 to 1992,
 and is considered to be one of the most modern opera houses in Europe. It seats 720 people.

Intendant Bernhard Helmich focused on the presentation of rarely played historic operas, such as Mascagni's Iris, Nicolai's Il templario and Die Heimkehr des Verbannten, Pfitzner's Die Rose vom Liebesgarten, Reznicek's Benzin, and Schreker's Der Schmied von Gent. Vasco de Gama, an early version of Meyerbeer's L'Africaine, was named Wiederentdeckung des Jahres (Rediscovery of the year) in 2013 by the journal Opernwelt. German premieres have included Jonathan Dove's Pinocchios Abenteuer, and both Love and Other Demons and Paradise Reloaded (Lilith) by Péter Eötvös.

Stadthalle Chemnitz

Located at Theaterstraße 3   was built between 1969 and 1974 as a multi-purpose concert hall in the centre of the city. It was opened in 1974 and is the official home of the Robert-Schumann-Philharmonie, or short: Philharmonie. The orchestra performs a series of ten symphonic concerts there annually, as well as special concerts and chamber music performances. The orchestra also participates in opera, ballet, and musical theatre productions in the opera house.

Schauspielhaus Chemnitz 

Located at Zieschestraße 28  the playhouse is a new building, opened in 1980, after the former house burnt down in 1976 and was demolished. The repertory is focused on literary drama. Its smaller stage in the east wing, opened in 2011, is dedicated to the performance of premieres and contemporary theatre.

A smaller stage within the playhouse, formerly Kleine Bühne, is the main venue for the Figurentheater. Performances are staged with traditional marionettes, hand puppets, and rod puppets, as well as with free-forms of artistic puppet theatre.

References

External links 

 
 
 Theater Chemnitz Chemnitz
 Theater Chemnitz Operabase
 Theater Chemnitz Klassik heute

Opera houses in Germany
Music venues completed in 1909
Theatres completed in 1909
Theatres completed in 1951
Music venues completed in 1951
opera
opera